Nation Media Group (abbreviated as NMG) is a Kenyan media group listed on the Nairobi Stock Exchange. NMG was founded by Aga Khan IV in 1959 under AKFED and is the largest private media house in East and Central Africa with offices in Kenya, Uganda, and Tanzania. In 1999, NMG launched NTV, a news channel in Kenya, and Easy FM.

Media outlets
The group publications include The EastAfrican, Daily Nation, Business Daily Africa, Daily Monitor, The Citizen, NMG Investor Briefing, Taifa Leo and Zuqka. The Daily Nation and the Sunday edition of the same newspaper, the Sunday Nation, celebrated their 50th anniversaries, branded by the Nation Media Group as "50 Golden Years", in 2010.

NMG owns a 76.5% stake in the Monitor Publications Limited and 93.3 KFM, a Kampala-based radio station in Uganda. It also owns two television stations in the country, NTV Uganda and Spark TV. NMG also has a 60% shareholding in Mwananchi Communications Limited''' in Tanzania. The group's East African subsidiaries, especially the Tanzanian business, contribute significantly to growth in the group.

In March 2016, NMG commissioned a new state-of-the art printing press on Mombasa Road in Nairobi. The new facility has capacity to print 86,000 newspapers per hour. It cost KSh2 billion (about US$20 million) and will print the dailies Daily Nation, Business Daily, Taifa Leo and the weekly The EastAfrican''.

Shareholding
The shares of stock of the Group are listed at the Nairobi Stock Exchange and are cross-listed at the Uganda Securities Exchange as well as the Rwanda Stock Exchange, trading at all three bourses under the symbol "NMG". As at December 2014, there were a total of 10,436 shareholders in the company. Of these, 4,135, owned 1 to 500 shares each, with a cumulative total of 782,157 shares, controlling 0.41 percent of the company. The seven largest shareholders controlled 62.57 percent of the total shareholding. These included:
 Aga Khan Fund for Economic Development with 44.66 percent. 
 Alpine Investments Limited with 10.15 percent. 
 National Social Security Fund with 3.44 percent. 
 John Kibunga Kimani who had 1.54 percent shareholding. 
 Jubilee Insurance Company of Kenya Limited with 1.07 percent. 
 Standard Chartered Nominees A/c KE17984, who controlled 0.91 percent 
 CfC Stanbic Nominee Limited with 0.81 percent shareholding.

Awards 

 2021 IF Design Awards for an outstanding digital platform
 2021 Global Media Awards (by the International News Media Association (INMA))
 2022 Global Media Awards

See also
 List of newspapers in Kenya
 List of newspapers in Tanzania
 List of newspapers in Uganda

References

External links

2008 annual report
The Citizen newspaper website - The official website for The Citizen Tanzania newspaper
The Mwananchi newspaper website - The official website for Mwananchi Tanzania Newspaper
The Mwanaspoti newspaper website - The official website for Mwanaspoti Tanzania newspaper
Mwananchi Communications Ltd website - The official website for Mwananchi Communications Ltd, its subsidiary in Tanzania

 
Newspapers published in Kenya
Mass media in Nairobi
Companies listed on the Nairobi Securities Exchange
Companies listed on the Uganda Securities Exchange
Companies listed on the Rwanda Stock Exchange
Mass media companies established in 1959
Kenyan companies established in 1959